Pitchamon Opatniput (sometimes written as Opatniputh; born 4 January 2007) is a Thai badminton player. She started playing badminton at the age of five and was trained by her father at the Thai Smile Badminton Club.

Career

2018–2019 
She won two junior titles in 2018 at the Jakarta Junior and the Korea Junior. In 2019, she won the Pembangunan Jaya Raya Junior Grand Prix.

2022 
In January, she won her first international title as a senior at the Swedish Open after defeating Pornpicha Choeikeewong in the finals. In May, she was selected as a backup for the Thailand women's team at the 2022 Thomas & Uber Cup and won a bronze medal. She was also selected for the following 2021 Southeast Asian Games and won gold.

In June, she won her second international title at the Denmark Masters by defeating Sung Shuo-yun of Chinese Taipei in three tight games.

Achievements

BWF International Challenge/Series (3 titles) 
Women's singles

  BWF International Challenge tournament
  BWF International Series tournament

BWF Junior International (3 titles) 
Girls' singles

  BWF Junior International Grand Prix tournament
  BWF Junior International Challenge tournament
  BWF Junior International Series tournament
  BWF Junior Future Series tournament

References

External links 
 

Living people
2007 births
Pitchamon Opatniput
Competitors at the 2021 Southeast Asian Games
Pitchamon Opatniput
Southeast Asian Games medalists in badminton
Pitchamon Opatniput
Pitchamon Opatniput